Marcus E. Chait (born March 18, 1973) is an American film and television actor and producer.

Early life
Chait was born in Menlo Park, California on March 18, 1973.

Career
His television appearances include ER, CSI: Miami and Terminator: The Sarah Connor Chronicles.

He appeared in films such as Million Dollar Baby, North Country and Proud.

Personal life
He is married to Melissa Bell. They have one child.

Filmography

Film

Television

Stage

References

External links

1973 births
American male film actors
American male television actors
American male stage actors
American producers
People from Menlo Park, California
Living people